Baron Nunburnholme, of the City of Kingston-upon-Hull, is a title in the Peerage of the United Kingdom. It was created in 1906 for the former Liberal Member of Parliament for Hull and Hull West, Charles Wilson. His son, the second Baron, also represented Hull West in Parliament as a Liberal and served as Lord Lieutenant of the East Riding of Yorkshire between 1908 and 1924. The title descended from father to son until the death of the second Baron's grandson, the fourth Baron, in 1999. The late Baron was succeeded by his younger brother, the fifth Baron.  the title is held by the latter's son, the sixth Baron, who succeeded in 2000.

Barons Nunburnholme (1906)
Charles Henry Wilson, 1st Baron Nunburnholme (1833–1907)
Charles Henry Wellesley Wilson, 2nd Baron Nunburnholme (1875–1924)
Charles John Wilson, 3rd Baron Nunburnholme (1904–1974)
Ben Charles Wilson, 4th Baron Nunburnholme (1928–1998)
Charles Thomas Wilson, 5th Baron Nunburnholme (1935–2000)
Stephen Charles Yanath Wilson, 6th Baron Nunburnholme (b. 1973)

The heir apparent is the present holder's son, the Hon. Charles Taiyo Christobal Wilson (b. 2002).

Male-line family tree

Notes

References

 
Kidd, Charles, Williamson, David (editors). Debrett's Peerage and Baronetage (1990 edition). New York: St Martin's Press, 1990, 

Baronies in the Peerage of the United Kingdom
Noble titles created in 1906
Noble titles created for UK MPs